Lagna Pahave Karun is a 2013 Indian Marathi-language romantic comedy film directed by Ajay Naik, and produced by Kiran Deshpande and Mohan Damle under the banners of Solariz International and Sprints Arts Creations respectively.

The film stars Umesh Kamat and Mukta Barve; it is the third collaboration between Kamat and Barve after Eka Lagnachi Dusri Goshta (2012) and also features Tejashri Pradhan and Siddharth Chandekar. The film follows Aditi Tilak (Barve) and Nishant Barve (Kamat) who set up their own matrimonial agency based on modern principles rather than horoscopes.

The soundtrack and background score were composed by Ajay Naik while the cinematography, art direction, and editing were handled by Abhijeet Abde, Padmanabh Damle and Suchitra Sathe respectively. The film was released on 4 October 2013.

Plot 
Nishant Barve is an Indian software designer who works and stays in America. During his return to India, he loses his job in the US. He decides to meet and inform his fiancée, Madhura Godbole. When Nishant is going to meet his fiancée he accidentally meets Aditi Tilak, a girl who plans to have her own matrimonial agency. Learning that his fiancée is more interested in the American lifestyle than him, Nishant breaks up with her.

Once again Nishant accidentally meets Aditi and she shares her dream to have her own matrimonial agency with him. Nishant applies for another job in the United States but is more interested in Aditi's proposal of a matrimonial agency, so he decides not to go to the interview. Praful Patel and his girlfriend decide to assist Aditi in her proposal. Nishant and Aditi, along with their associates, plan innovative ideas on getting people married. They decide not to check the horoscopes of the couple. Thus they start their matrimonial agency, "Shubhvivaah".

Rahul Kulkarni and Aanandi meet each other through Shubhvivaah and decide to get married. Soon people are attracted by this new way of getting married. On the wedding day of Rahul and Aanandi Nalini Dixit, a renowned astrologer and owner of a successful marriage bureau in Pune declares that their horoscopes don't match and the marriage won't last for more than six months. However, Nishant and Aditi are not affected by this and meanwhile fall in love with each other.

Nishant proposes to Aditi and tells her that he rejected his job and a luxurious life in the USA just for her incomplete proposal of matrimonial agency as he loves her. Aditi tells Nishant that no one has ever loved her as he does but she has not thought over it. On the other hand, Rahul and Aanandi start facing problems in their married life because of Aanandi's rigid nature. Aditi and Nishant keep suggesting to Rahul ways to keep Aanandi happy but in vain. One day, Rahul and Aanandi have a bad fight, after which Rahul meets with an accident.

Aditi, out of guilt for the failure of Aanandi and Rahul's marriage, stops her marriage institution. An enraged Nishant tells Aditi that she is wrong in her decision and shows his disappointment and disagreement with her decision and decides to leave for America. Meanwhile, Aanandi realizes her mistake and reconciles with Rahul. Nishant learns about Aditi's past. Aditi had lost her parents and twice her prospective grooms died. People blamed Aditi's destiny for this and no one dared to marry her or keep any kind of relation with her.

Nishant then understands why Aditi is always scared and insecure and how she did not respond to his marriage proposal, as she loves him and does not want him to get harmed due to her. Nishant meets Aditi and tells her that its high time she needs to move on and get married, if not with him then with someone else, and settle down. The film ends with Nishant and Aditi sharing a hug (indicating that Aditi has accepted Nishant's marriage proposal) and going somewhere hand in hand.

Cast 
Mukta Barve as Aditi Tilak, owner of the matrimonial agency "Shubhvivaah"
Umesh Kamat as Nishant Barve, Aditi's love interest and partner in ownership of "Shubhvivaah"
Siddharth Chandekar as Rahul Kulkarni, he gets married with Aanadi through Shubhvivaah
Tejashri Pradhan as Aanandi Rahul Kulkarni, Rahul's wife
Swati Chitnis as Nalini "Nallutai" Dixit, an astrologer who is against Shubhvivaah
Jayant Sawarkar as Aditi's grandfather, he is an astrologer
Manasi Magikar as Nishant's mother
Seema Chandekar as Rahul's mother
Umesh Damle as Nishant's father
Shrikar Pitre as Praful Patel, Aditi and Nishant's assistant
Sayali Deodhar as Praful's girlfriend, Aditi and Nishant's assistant
Priyanka Barve as Madhura Godbole, Nishant's ex-fiancé
Rahul Navel as Vitthhal, Aditi and Nishant's assistant

Production 
Lagna Pahave Karun was produced by Kiran Deshpande and Mohan Damle under the banner of Solariz International and Sprints Arts Creations respectively. It was co-produced by Sanjeev Langarkande and Ashish Deshpande and written by Kshtij Patwardhan and Sameer Vidwans based on a story by Ajay Naik.

The film was shot at various locations in Pune and Alibaug.

Umesh Kamat was the first to sign onto the film. Mukta Barve was chosen in as the female lead. Siddharth Chandekar and Tejashree Pradhan were later signed on for pivotal roles. Pradhan and Chandekar play Aanadi and Rahul, respectively. Swati Chitnis also played a vital role in the film.

Reception 
Daily News and Analysis wrote about the film "Clever writing, well-etched out characters, witty dialogue and brilliant performances make this film a fun watch". Indian Nerve stated that "Lagna Pahave Karun is the story of enduring and making things work without faltering". The film received 3.5 stars from Marathistars.com. Rajshri Marathi also wrote good reviews about the film.

Soundtrack 

The music for Lagna Pahave Karun is composed by Ajay Naik. Ajay Naik has also composed the original background score. The lyrics are penned by Ambarish Deshpande, Ajay Naik, Vaibhav Joshi, Kshitij Patwardhan. The soundtrack which included seven songs was released on 28 August 2013 by Everest Entertainment.

Awards and nominations

References

External links 
 
 
 
  on Hotstar

2013 films
Indian romantic musical films
2010s musical comedy-drama films
2010s romantic musical films
2013 romantic comedy-drama films
Indian romantic comedy-drama films
2010s Marathi-language films
2013 comedy films
2013 drama films